Breiliflaka  is a mountain in the municipality of Modum in Buskerud, Norway. It is located south of the Tyrifjord.

References

Modum
Mountains of Viken